Kilómetro 111 is a 1938  Argentine musical film drama directed by Mario Soffici. The film premiered in Buenos Aires.

The film is one of several films directed by Soffici which address the social evils of historical Argentina. The film is based on Carlos Olivari's play La tercera invasion inglesa (1936), which is a fictional semi-documentary of the British railroad monopoly. The film is set in a town in central Argentina and documents the tragedy of the poverty-stricken rural farmers who are forced to sell their harvest to the railroad developers. In an attempt to avoid being exploited, the farmers send their wheat to Buenos Aires, where they unsuccessfully fail to obtain a bank loan. In the end it is down to the generosity of the station master that they are able to use the new line to transport their goods, although his generosity means that he is fired from his job.

In a survey of the 100 greatest films of Argentine cinema carried out by the Museo del Cine Pablo Ducrós Hicken in 2000, the film reached the 33rd position.

Cast
Pepe Arias   
Delia Garcés   
José Olarra   
Ángel Magaña   
Miguel Gómez Bao   
Juan Bono   
Inés Edmonson   
Adolfo Meyer   
Choly Mur   
Héctor Méndez   
Julio Renato   
Alberto Terrones   
Robert Colléy as Wisecracking Terrorist #2
Cirilo Etulain   
Arturo Podestá

References

External links

1938 films
1930s Spanish-language films
Argentine black-and-white films
Films directed by Mario Soffici
1930s musical drama films
Argentine musical drama films
1938 drama films
1930s Argentine films